Three Girls Spinning is a 1950 West German comedy film directed by Carl Froelich and starring Albrecht Schoenhals, Adelheid Seeck and Axel von Ambesser. It was shot at the Tempelhof Studios in Berlin. The film's sets were designed by the art director Erich Kettelhut.

Cast
 Albrecht Schoenhals as Eduard Amberg
 Adelheid Seeck as Magda Amberg
 Axel von Ambesser as Professor Hartwig
 Georg Thomalla as Bollmann
 Renate Barken as Beate Amberg
 Maria Körber as Elfriede Amberg
 Susanne Körber-Harlan as Maxi Amberg
 Harald Juhnke as Pfarrer Krempel
 Otto Gebühr as Lehmann
 Bully Buhlan as Singer
 Oscar Sabo as Briefträger
 Agnes Windeck as Wirtschafterin

References

Bibliography 
 Bock, Hans-Michael & Bergfelder, Tim. The Concise Cinegraph: Encyclopaedia of German Cinema. Berghahn Books, 2009.

External links 
 

1950 films
1950 comedy films
German comedy films
West German films
1950s German-language films
Films directed by Carl Froelich
German black-and-white films
1950s German films
Films shot at Tempelhof Studios